Chingiztau is a range of mountains in Abai Region, Kazakhstan.

The nearest city is Ayagoz, located near the southern end of the range.

Geography 
Chingiztau is one of the ranges of the eastern part of the Kazakh Upland system (Saryarka). The range has three separate ridges: 
Kanchingiz (Қаншыңғыс), highest point  in the northern section, the Chingiztau proper in the middle, highest point , and Akshatau (Ақшатау) in the southern section, where there is highest point of the whole range system  Mount Kosoba. 

The slopes of the ridges are generally abrupt in the eastern side and more gently sloping in the western. They are deeply dissected by river valleys and ravines. Numerous rivers have their origin in the range, but their waters are mostly lost either in the sands of the surrounding deserts or in seasonal salt lakes of the highlands. The largest rivers having their sources in the Chingiztau are the Shagan and its right tributary the Ashchysu flowing roughly northwards, as well as the Bakanas and a few tributaries of the Ayagöz flowing south. The Konyr-Auliye cave (Қоңыр әулие үңгірі) is located near Mount Aktas, off the western slopes of the range, near the Shagan river.

Flora
The range slopes are covered by mountain steppe vegetation. There are aspen-birch forests and willow thickets in the valleys.

See also
Geography of Kazakhstan

References

External links

Visit Kazakhstan
General physical and geographical conditions of East Kazakhstan (in Russian)
Kazakh Uplands
Abai Region